Suriya Domtaisong (born January 20, 1981) is a Thai retired professional footballer who played as a striker.

International career

Suriya played for the Thailand national team. He played 26 games and scored two goals.

International goals

Honours

Club
Bangkok University
 Thai Division 1 League (1): 2002
 Thai Premier League (1): 2006

Buriram
 Thai Division 1 League (1): 2011

Buriram United
 Thai Premier League : 2013
 Thai FA Cup (2) : 2012, 2013 
 Thai League Cup (2): 2012, 2013
 Kor Royal Cup : 2013

External links
 
 

1981 births
Living people
Suriya Domtaisong
Suriya Domtaisong
Association football forwards
Suriya Domtaisong
Kelantan FA players
Suriya Domtaisong
Suriya Domtaisong
Suriya Domtaisong
Suriya Domtaisong
Suriya Domtaisong
Malaysia Super League players
Thai expatriate footballers
Thai expatriate sportspeople in Malaysia
Expatriate footballers in Malaysia
Suriya Domtaisong